Polygrammodes is a genus of moths of the family Crambidae.

Species
Polygrammodes atricosta Hampson, 1913
Polygrammodes auropurpuralis Dognin, 1903
Polygrammodes baeuscalis Dyar, 1913
Polygrammodes biangulalis Dognin, 1903
Polygrammodes citrinalis Hampson, 1913
Polygrammodes compositalis (Lederer, 1863)
Polygrammodes croesus (Druce, 1895)
Polygrammodes cuneatalis Dognin, 1908
Polygrammodes cyamon Druce, 1899
Polygrammodes delicata Munroe, 1960
Polygrammodes dubialis Schaus, 1924
Polygrammodes eaclealis Munroe, 1958
Polygrammodes effusalis Walker, 1866
Polygrammodes eleuata (Fabricius, 1777)
Polygrammodes ephremalis Schaus, 1927
Polygrammodes faraonyalis Viette, 1954
Polygrammodes farinalis Hampson, 1899
Polygrammodes fenestrata Munroe, 1958
Polygrammodes flavescens Hampson, 1918
Polygrammodes flavidalis (Guenée, 1854)
Polygrammodes flavivenata Munroe, 1958
Polygrammodes fluminalis (Butler, 1883)
Polygrammodes fusinotalis Dognin, 1923
Polygrammodes griseinotata Munroe, 1958
Polygrammodes griveaudalis Viette, 1981
Polygrammodes harlequinalis Munroe, 1958
Polygrammodes hartigi Munroe, 1958
Polygrammodes hercules (C. Felder, R. Felder & Rogenhofer, 1875)
Polygrammodes herminealis Schaus, 1920
Polygrammodes hintzi Strand, 1911
Polygrammodes hyalescens Hampson, 1913
Polygrammodes hyalomaculata Dognin, 1908
Polygrammodes hyalosticta Hampson, 1899
Polygrammodes infixalis (Herrich-Schäffer, 1871)
Polygrammodes interpunctalis Dognin, 1904
Polygrammodes klagesi Munroe, 1958
Polygrammodes koepckei Munroe, 1958
Polygrammodes langdonalis
Polygrammodes leptorrhapta (Meyrick, 1936)
Polygrammodes leucalis (Guenée, 1854)
Polygrammodes lichyi Munroe, 1958
Polygrammodes limitalis Hampson, 1899
Polygrammodes maccalis (Lederer, 1863)
Polygrammodes maculiferalis (Dyar, 1910)
Polygrammodes mimetica Munroe, 1960
Polygrammodes modestalis Dyar, 1912
Polygrammodes moerulalis (Walker, 1859)
Polygrammodes naranja Munroe, 1959
Polygrammodes nervosa (Warren, 1889)
Polygrammodes nigrilinealis Hampson, 1903
Polygrammodes nonagrialis Hampson, 1899
Polygrammodes obscuridiscalis Munroe, 1958
Polygrammodes obsoletalis Munroe, 1958
Polygrammodes ostrealis (Guenée, 1854)
Polygrammodes oxydalis (Guenée, 1854)
Polygrammodes pareaclealis Munroe, 1958
Polygrammodes phaeocraspis Hampson, 1913
Polygrammodes phyllophila (Butler, 1878)
Polygrammodes ponderalis (Guenée, 1854)
Polygrammodes purpureorufalis Hampson, 1918
Polygrammodes quatrilis (Druce, 1902)
Polygrammodes rufinalis
Polygrammodes runicalis Guenée, 1854
Polygrammodes sabelialis (Guenée, 1854)
Polygrammodes sanguifrons Hampson, 1913
Polygrammodes sanguiguttalis Hampson, 1913
Polygrammodes sanguinalis Druce, 1895
Polygrammodes semirufa Hampson, 1913
Polygrammodes senahuensis (Druce, 1895)
Polygrammodes seyrigalis Viette, 1953
Polygrammodes spectabilis Munroe, 1958
Polygrammodes supproximalis Dognin, 1903
Polygrammodes supremalis Schaus, 1920
Polygrammodes tapsusalis (Walker, 1859)
Polygrammodes tessallalis Gaede, 1917
Polygrammodes trifolialis Dognin, 1908
Polygrammodes uniflexalis Dognin, 1903
Polygrammodes zischkai Munroe, 1960

References

Spilomelinae
Crambidae genera
Taxa named by Achille Guenée